The 1983 "Strike Hard" Anti-crime Campaign, or "Stern Blow" Anti-crime Campaign of 1983, was a massive anti-crime campaign initiated by Deng Xiaoping beginning in September 1983, then paramount leader of China. The campaign lasted for three years and five months, and was launched largely as a result nationwide worsening public safety post Cultural Revolution initiated by Mao Zedong from 1966 to 1976 during which rapes, murders, robberies, arson occurred at en-masse and even cannibalism in some parts of China due to the breakdown of social order and the public security system during the time.

In 1979, urban unemployed workers within the People's Republic of China has reached 20 million, the highest number of unemployed since the founding of People's Republic of China. In Beijing alone, unemployment amounted to some 400,000 accounting for 8.6% of the city's total population. On average one person was unemployed for every 2.7 urban residents. The maximum number of unemployed persons in Tianjin was 380,000, accounting for 11.7% of the city's total population. The unemployed also included the sent down youth forced to retreat into the mountains and the countryside during the cultural revolution, accounting for the newly increased urban idle population.

In December 1979, Li Xiannian stated at the National Work Conference initiated the down to the countryside movement. In 1980, the central government officially ended the 25-year policy and as a result large numbers of educated youths returned to the city, becoming unemployed in the process, aggravating the deterioration of public safety within cities.  At that time, according to national survey, there were 9 categories of people requesting to return to the city and reinstatement. In addition to the educated youth who went to the countryside and the mountains, workers who were collectivised and returned to their hometowns in the early 1960s also asked to return to work. Technical secondary school graduates also required uniform distribution from the state in terms of jobs. As a result, cities in China accumulated large numbers of the unemployed, at the same time dealing with a large influx returnees and former Red Guards from the down to the countryside movement further deteriorating the public security situation.

In May 1981, the central government held a public security symposium in Beijing, Tianjin, Shanghai, Guangzhou, and Wuhan, and formally adopting the "comprehensive governance" and the "rule of heavier and faster in accordance with the law" policy.

During the "three battles" of the "Strike Hard" campaign, some 197,000 criminal groups were cracked down, 1.772 million people were arrested and 1.747 million people were prosecuted with an estimated 30,000 sentenced to death. Although visible improvements in public safety followed, however, controversies arose as to whether some of the legal punishments were too harsh and whether the legal processes of many cases were in-complete and insufficiently rigorous.

Brief history

Background 
Prior to the crackdown and the launch of the reform and opening up policy in 1978, the public safety situation post cultural revolution was extremely chaotic. Women dared not go to night work alone, and parents were afraid to let children go out unescorted. According to data from the Ministry of Public Security, in 1978, 530,000 public security and criminal cases were filed in the People's Republic of China; in 1980, more than 750,000 cases were filed nationwide, including more than 50,000 major cases; in 1981, more than 890,000 cases were filed nationwide, including more than 67,000 major cases. In 1982, more than 740,000 cases were filed nationwide, including 64,000 major cases. In the first few months of 1983, the number of cases continued to increase sharply. Many of these cases caused serious disturbance to public security.

Rogue gangs 
Because many of the unemployed were former Red Guards during the Cultural Revolution, large numbers of unemployed youth formed gangs of various sizes. The most well-known groups are Tangshan Chopper Gang and Hunan Axe Gang which openly engaged in robbery and the molestation of women on streets. In Changzhou, Jiangsu, two gangsters headed by Lu Hongming and Zhou Honggen stalked urban-rural fringe and textile factories at night in order to molest and rape off-duty female workers. Since Guangdong Province was close to Hong Kong, Macao local underworld gangs liked to imitate the names of Hong-Kong based groups such as "Dragon Gang", "Honghua Hui", "Fist of Fury", "Dagger Society", etc.

General crime rate 
Gangs operated on the principle "violate small laws but not big laws" causing the public security situation to deteriorate. On major highways such as Guangshan and Guangzhan in Guangdong Province, gangsters would often climb vehicles at night to steal, looting pigs, cloth and other truck materials. Rogue thieves were also rampant at stations, piers, ferry ports and other places. Zhang Qin (张钦), an official of the Jingzhou District Committee of Hubei Province, believes that the rudimentary stage of the Chinese car bandit road tyrant case occurred before and after the crackdown in 1983. The gangsters pickpocketed from stations and buses, or used the form of guessing red and blue pencils and playing cards to swindle money and blackmail.

Major cases 
In Beijing, a suicide bombing at a railway station occurred on October 29, 1980. Wang Zhigang (王志刚), a worker at a tractor factory, caused a spontaneous explosion in the south corridor of the second floor of the Beijing railway station due to a romantic dispute, killing 9 people and injuring 81 people. On April 2, 1981, three escaped labor camp prisoners rushed to Beihai Park, hijacked, molested and raping three female middle school students who were the park at the time. In Guangzhou, on the evening of January 22, 1980, a gang of gangsters headed by Zhou Moumou and Lao Moumou carried knives and guns in a fight on Binjiang Road. After being stopped by police officer Bu Dongchang, the gang attacked Bu, Bu fired a warning shot to no avail and as a result killed the three offenders. Bu survived however was severely injured had his pistol was also snatched away during the ensuing struggle. On March 8, 1983, retired veteran and political and legal journalist  An Ke was attacked by three criminals after chasing after a thief who stole a wallet, dying of nine stab wounds in the process.

Shanghai Kongjiang Road Incident 
On the morning of September 9, 1979, Shi Hanpei, a traffic policeman on duty, found a young man robbed of crabs sold by a farmer, and arrested him. Nearby people were watching. Some gangsters took the opportunity to make trouble, besieged multiple policemen, stopped and smashed vehicles, overturned farmers’ carts, robbed passers-by and assaulted women. Among them, Wu, the deputy secretary of the Youth League Committee of the Shanghai Chemical Light Industry Company, who passed by Kongjiang Road, was surrounded by the gang who snatched her watch and hand-bag and sexually assaulted her. Wu's breast and vulva were all lacerated as a result of the assault. It was not until 8 pm that the Yangpu Public Security Bureau and the Shanghai Public Security Bureau jointly dispatched more than 300 police officers to control the situation. After the incident, 31 gangsters were arrested, 7 were sentenced, and 11 ordered to undertake re-education through labor.

Rape and murder case in Xiguitu Banner of Hulunbuir League 
On June 16, 1983, Hongqigou Farm, Forestry Design Institute, Xiguitu Banner, Hulunbuir League, Inner Mongolia. Yu Hongjie (于洪杰), Han Lijun (韩立军), and Yang Wanchun (杨万春), three gangster youths with a record of theft and criminal offending, invited Wang Shouli and seven other youths to drink together. Taking advantage of the drunkenness, a group of people agreed to engage bloodbath at red flag ditch. Wang Shouli and Li Dongdong were unwilling to participate and were coerced by the others. Yu Hongjie and 8 people were killed with knives at Hongqigou Farm. The main target was men. 16 people were killed in 1 hour. Later, a group of females on the farm were kidnapped, rape and gang rape ensued and several were killed after. After recovering from their drunken killing rampage, Yu and Han knowing they could not escape death penalty, proceeded to blow themselves up with gasoline. Han Lijun died and Yu Hongjie however was seriously injured. Several young women escaped from the farm and asked for help. The police rushed to capture the remaining seven gangsters. Afterwards, the two survivors, Yu Hongjie and Yang Lichun, were sentenced to death and executed. The remaining criminals were not sentenced to death because since they were underage.

The "two kings of northeast" 
"The Second King of Northeast China" refers to the brothers Wang Zongmou (王宗𤤁) and Wang Zongwei (王宗玮) from Shenyang. The Brothers Er and Wang were born in a teacher's family and grew up during the Cultural Revolution. The older brother Wang Zong was a habitual thief. Known to have been mingling with pickpockets since elementary school, and entered mental asylums twice in the later period of the Cultural Revolution. His younger brother Wang Zongwei also participated theft with his brother. In 1976, the Second Kings stole three pistols from Shenyang Dabei Prison .

At noon on February 12, 1983, the brothers entered the Shenyang Air Force 463 Hospital to steal. They were discovered by the hospital staff and brought under control. In order to escape, the two shot four people and wounded one on the spot fleeing the scene afterwards. On the 15th, the two men were in the train because the police found that they were carrying a pistol and shot and wounded a police officer and then proceeding to flee to Hengyang, Hunan. The two sheltered in the vacant building belonging to Hengyang Metallurgical Machinery Factory. On the 17th, Wu Guoying, a cadre of the metallurgical plant, and other employees found Wang Zongwei along with a pistol. During the chase, the two brothers once again killed a person and wounded three others. The brothers then proceeded flee from city to city, Wuhan to Jiangyin; robbing and murdering as they fled eventually being apprehended and shot dead by the police in Nankeng Mountain, Guangchang County, Jiangxi Province.

Zhu Guohua (Grandson of Zhu De) 

In 1982, Zhu Guohua the grandson of general Zhu De was charged with the rape of 15 women, 7 counts of attempted rape, 21 counts of torture and rape, 26 counts of molestation, and 17 counts of entrapment, totaling 86 charges. On September 18, 1983, Zhu Guohua and six other suspects were sentenced to death.

Progress and results 
The "Strike Hard" campaign was launched during the early stage of legal re-construction in China when the legal system had been almost destroyed in the Cultural Revolution. The criminal law of China came into effect in 1980 and the new Constitution of China was passed in 1982; subsequently, the campaign was formally launched in September 1983 and lasted until January 1987, receiving support from Deng Xiaoping.

There campaign consisted of three rounds or "battles" as described by the state media outlets. In total, some 197,000 criminal groups were cracked down, 1.772 million people were arrested, 321,000 were re-educated through labor and 1.747 million people received legal punishment, with some 24,000 were executed (mainly in the first round), having an immediate effect on public safety. Scholars estimate that during the three years of the campaign, some 30,000 people were sentenced to death. A number of people arrested (some even received death penalty) were children or relatives of government officials at various levels, including the grandson of Zhu De, demonstrating the principle of "equality before the law".

Controversies 
The campaign itself was the subject of much controversy due to reported use of torture, extrajudicial detentions, arrest quotas, forced confessions and miscarriages of justice in which innocents were executed and or imprisoned for extended periods of time. The long-term effectiveness of the  "strike hard" campaign on public safety has also been questioned. Almost immediately after the 1996 campaign ended, criminal cases began to climb, and by September 1997, monthly crime rates were back where they had been when the campaign began according to Liu Renwen, a lawyer who studied the campaigns at the Chinese Academy of Social Sciences' Institute of Law in Beijing. The New York Times stated that the result of the campaign were largely ineffective due to the underfunding, training and financing of the police force. According to the Times, the percentage of policemen killed in the line of duty in during the campaign was several times higher than the United States and as many as 10 times the rate during the Mao era.

Continuation into early 2001 
The campaign continued sporadically into early 2001, with the state newspaper the People's Daily reporting the widespread and multiple cases of execution of gangsters and or individuals involved in organized crime specifically in cases of robberies, kidnapping, blackmail, drug trafficking.

Modern day effects 
Since the initiation of the first campaign in 1983, the Chinese government has initiated a number of other campaigns under the "strike hard" slogan such as the strike hard campaign against violent extremism in Xinjiang involving the detention of millions of Uryghurs, political and religious repression, and widespread dissemination of surveillance described by some as "dystopian" within the region.

Anti Corruption and New Strike Hard Campaigns 

Under the anti-corruption campaign launched under CCP general secretary Xi Jinping, a parallel campaign against organized crime and local party officials who shelter criminal networks and criminal groups has also been enacted since 2013. In July 2021, South China Morning Post reported that Chen Yixin secretary general of the Central Political and Legal Affairs Commission stated that the new "strike hard" campaign against organized crime in 2018 would target the telecoms, resources, transport and construction sectors, industries in which rent seeking and corruption are commonly known to take place in China.

The campaign, launched in 2018, was originally meant to run for three years. However, in March, Guo Shengkun, party secretary of the commission, said the campaign would continue as it had “won the people's support” for cleaning up the grass roots governance system (referring to residential communities in cities and villages in rural areas).

See also 

 Campaign to Suppress Counterrevolutionaries
 Cultural Revolution
 Boluan Fanzheng
 Reform and Opening-up
 1982 Constitution
 History of the People's Republic of China
 Legal history of China

References 

1980s in China
Deng Xiaoping